Events from 2022 in Easter Island.

Events 
Ongoing – COVID-19 pandemic in Easter Island

 21 May – The Ministry of economy, development and tourism announces that Easter Island will reopen on 1 August after being closed to tourists for two years during the COVID-19 pandemic.
 1 August – Easter Island reopens to tourists.

References 

2022 in Easter Island
2020s in Easter Island
Years of the 21st century in Easter Island
Easter Island